Hay Hassani is a district, arrondissement and suburb of southwestern Casablanca, in the Berrechid Province of the Casablanca-Settat region of Morocco. The district covers an area of 25.91 square kilometres (10 square miles) and as of 2004 had 323,277 inhabitants. The district contains one arrondissement of the same name.

References

Districts of Casablanca